Houston International Festival, also known as iFest, was a contemporary, multi-disciplinary, multi-cultural arts and music festival held annually in Houston, Texas. By city ordinance this annual 10-day event is Houston's official city celebration of the visual and performing arts. According to an article in the Houston Chronicle,  Ifest announced  in June 2014 that it was seeking Chapter 7 bankruptcy protection, making it clear that the 2014 fest would be the last ever festival.

Overview

The annual downtown event celebrates music, dance and cultures from around the world. Early festivals featured almost exclusively local acts; as the festival grew, more international and nationally known artists (most recently in 2010, George Clinton, Steel Pulse, Eddie Palmieri, and Ozomatli were scheduled in addition to regional and local performers).

The festival features vendors selling local and international foods and crafts. iFest also features six to eight arts markets with more than 400 artists including a juried art market.

The festival has the large areas dedicated to cultural and educational exhibits depicting different cultures. The footprint is divided into zones, each one focusing on a specific culture through food, exhibits and entertainment. The Living Museum represents the spotlighted culture each year with iconic structures, interactive exhibits, artisan demonstrations and performances.

The festival impacts Houston's tourism and economy by drawing 22% tourists attendance and generates local and state tourist-based taxes of $2.19 million.

The Houston International Festival is owned by the Houston Festival Foundation, Inc., a 501 (c)(3) organization, which uses the proceeds from the festival for year-round arts and education programs for schoolchildren in the Greater Houston area.

History
In 1971 Main Street 1 was the name given to a Salute to the Arts to be held Downtown—a weekend happening of celebrations highlighting the performing and visual arts, on the sidewalks, streets, and store windows located between Dallas and McKinney on Main Street in Houston, Texas. Sakowitz and Foleys Department Stores, and the Cultural Affairs Committee of the Houston Chamber of Commerce, with the blessing of Mayor Louie Welch, sponsored the event. It was the beginning of the cultural salute that grew and evolved into today's Houston International Festival. In 1987, iFest began featuring the art and culture of a different honoured country each year and began complementing local artists with regional, national and international artists. Today, the international component sets the tone for an evolving celebration of world culture.

Timeline
1973: Houston's Main Street Art Happening was moved from Downtown Houston, Texas (where the City Ordinance prohibited street closings) to the Houston Museum of Fine Arts and its grounds across from the Contemporary Arts Museum, still on Main but now more "mid-town". This attempt at an outdoor-indoor celebration created safety concerns with crowds of pedestrians crossing streets, so in...

1974: The Art Happening moved to Hermann Park, near the Museum. It was expanded to two weekends to help minimize the risk of inclement weather affecting attendance.

1976: The event was named "The Houston Festival", and remained so for the next ten years. The organizational structure changed, with the creation of The Houston Festival Foundation, a 501 (c)(3) non-profit with its own Board of Directors and budget, separate from the Houston Chamber of Commerce sponsorship. The foundation still remains the producing entity today.

1977: The festival moved back downtown, this time with two stages across from the Alley Theatre and Jones Hall, at what is now Jones Plaza. Attendance grew but expansion was limited in that site.

1979: The festival moved to a larger potential site at Market Square, in order to accommodate the growing number of participants and attendees.

1980  The Houston Festival Foundation, a non-profit 501(c)3 organization was spun off, as an independent entity, from the Houston Chamber of Commerce, with a mission to celebrate and promote the arts of Houston to the rest of the world. It was supported by the City of Houston, the Houston Cultural Arts Council, and the Greater Houston Convention and Visitors Council. The board of Directors hired their first President, Rochella Cooper who immediately set out to involve the performing, visual, and literary arts organizations and individuals in promoting Houston through the Festival.

1981   The Festival expanded its location to encompass, over the next six years, twenty downtown blocks including nine performing stages, 350 fine craft artists, an outdoor sculpture exhibition along the banks of the Buffalo Bayou, and the involvement of all major arts organizations. (Houston Symphony, Houston Grand Opera, Houston Ballet, and The Alley Theatre) And all of this was free to the public.

1983   The President was charged by the Board of Directors with developing a five year plan that would include the important sesquicentennial of Houston and Texas in 1986. Out of this plan emerged the big event in 1986.

1985   The first Art Car Parade took place during the Houston Festival exposing thousands of attendees to the creativity of the art car makers. 

1986   New Music America, a national showcase for new music, chose Houston for their annual gathering of top professionals in all genre including world renowned composers such as John Cage. 
 
1986: "Rendez-vous Houston", highlighting the anniversaries of Houston and Texas' Sesquicentennial celebrations was the biggest event ever staged in Houston, produced as the centerpiece of the Houston Festival. Lasers and fireworks danced above and around the skyscrapers downtown accompanied by French composer Jean-Michel Jarre's original music compositions. In June 1986 President Rochella Cooper resigned to accept other opportunities.
Dr. James Austin was hired in late summer 1986, and with the Board set out to re-examine the path and future for the festival. This began the expansion of the basic concepts of the event, adding the now-established education and business collaborations and programs.

1987: The name of the celebration was changed to "The Houston International Festival" to celebrate Houston's role as an international city. Following this event, a plan was developed to spotlight the arts and cultures of an individual country or region of the world each year, with request for assistance from the participating governments at the highest levels possible. At this point the Board of Directors decided to charge admission to the Festival and fenced the entire area to contain the event.

1988: Australia was the first country of honor, with the international theme presenting an amalgam of that country's culture and arts. A different country or region in alternate parts of the globe were to be selected for the "spotlight" thereafter, although the festival continued to build more performing stages to ensure on-going presentations of arts from throughout the world during the two-week event.

1989-2003: 1989 continued the new pattern with the spotlight on France, followed by the United Kingdom (1990); Japan (1991); Spain & the New World (1992); Mexico (1993); Italy (1994); Turkey (1995); West Africa (1996); China (1997); Islands of the Caribbean (1998); Southern Africa (1999); Brazil for the 2000 Millennium; Ireland (2001); and a revisit to France in 2002 and Mexico in 2003. After twenty years, the City Ordinance regarding the festival's unique status lapsed, and downtown Houston was in the throes of a major renaissance of urban development and street improvements. Possible congestion and other factors presented the foundation with the need for an examination for alternative sites. The Houston International Festival moved south, this time following the tracks of the METRO's new light rail transportation line for better access and more space to Reliant Park.

2004: The Houston International Festival turned towards Asia with its first spotlight on Thailand at Festival Plaza at Reliant Park. Five Asian elephants joined the programming mix in a special appeal to families.

2005-2007: The Houston International Festival returned to its previous downtown footprint covering  in downtown Houston parks and plazas. iFest  turned its spotlight on India in 2005, Jamaica in 2006 and China in 2007.

2008: The Houston International Festival offered a new twist on its honored country theme. The theme for iFest 2008, "Out of Africa: the Three Journeys", celebrated the rich history, achievements, contributions and triumphs of African people in Africa, the Caribbean, Latin America, the United States and the rest of the world.

2009: iFest returned to its honored country theme and revisited the culture of Ireland.

2010: The honored region for the 2010 Houston International Festival was the Caribbean.

2011: THE SILK ROAD – The 2011 theme for the Houston International Festival follows the route of Marco Polo with a focus on China, India and other cultures of the Silk Road.

2012: Honored country was Argentina.

2013: Honored country was Brazil.

2014: Australia becomes the honored country theme.

June 2014: Houston Festival Foundation announces plans to file for Chapter 7 bankruptcy.

Presenters of world music
From its inception in 1971, artists from Houston had been the primary source of programming. In 1987, iFest began featuring the art and culture of a different honored country each year and began complementing local artists with regional, national and international artists. The festival is a very popular event in Texas for world music, afropop, blues, rock, country, reggae, soul, cajun, zydeco and almost all other music fans. The event features hundreds of performers on six to ten stages including many internationally touring artists. The festival has become one of the premier music festivals in the state of Texas.  Performers who have appeared at the festival include:

 John Lee Hooker - USA
 Bobby Blue Band - USA
 Clarence Gatemouth Brown - USA
 Koko Tayler - USA
 Lucinda Williams - USA
 Jimmie Dale Gilmore - USA
 Jerry Jeff Walker - USA
 Dave Alvin - USA
 The Flatlanders - USA
 Grady Gaines - USA (Texas)
 Chris Perez - USA (Texas)
 Ezra Charles - USA (Texas)
 Smythe and Taylor - USA (Texas)
 Joe Ely - USA
 Delbert McClinton - USA
 Quetzal (band) - USA
 Shawn Colvin - USA
 Bakra Bata - USA
 Trish Murphy - USA (Texas). Also performed as "Trish and Daren."
 Hugh Masekela - South Africa
 Abdullah Ibrahim - South Africa
 Ramsey Lewis - USA
 Flora Purim  & Airto - Brazil
 Paris Combo - France
 Tete Montoliu - Spain 
 Michel Petrucciani - France
 World Saxophone Quartet - USA
 Youssou N'Dour - Senegal
 Salif Keita - Mali
 Baaba Maal - Senegal
 Babatunde Olatunji - Nigeria
 Angélique Kidjo - Benin
 Ashe Dancers - Jamaica
 Blue Glades Mento Band - Jamaica
 Brave Combo - USA
 Avizo - USA
 Grupo Fantasma - USA
 Morgan Heritage - Jamaica
 Yerba Bueno - USA
 Red Elvises - USA
 La Bottine Souriante - Quebec
 Skatalites - Jamaica
 Stephen Marley - Jamaica
 Billy Joe Shaver - USA
 Tinariwen - Tuareg-Sahara
 Gangbe Brass Band - Benin
 Ba Cissoko - Guinea
 George Clinton & Parliament-Funkadelic - USA
 Amazones Women Master Drummers of Guinea - Guinea
 Afrissippi - USA
 Yellow Man - Jamaica
 Wayne Henderson & the Jazz Crusaders - USA
 Clinton Fearon - Jamaica
 Vieux Farka Toure - Mali
 Chic Gamine - Quebec
 Marc Broussard - USA
 Mavis Staples - USA
 Alpha YaYa Diallo - Guinea
 Steel Pulse - Great Britain/Jamaica
 La Excelencia - USA
 Cesária Évora- Cape Verde
 Femi Kuti & Positive Force - Nigeria
 King Sunny Adé - Nigeria
 Ali Farka Toure - Mali
 Papa Wemba - Nigeria
 Thomas Mapfumo- Zimbabwe
 Zap Mama- Democratic Republic of Congo
 Oumou Sangare - Mali
 Tabu Ley Rochereau- Democratic Republic of Congo
 Super Rail Band - Mali
 Cubanismo- Cuba
 Los Munequitos de Matanzas - Cuba
 Maraca - Cuba
 Burning Spear - Jamaica
 Boukman Eksperyans - Haiti
 Sharon Shannon - Ireland
 Natalie MacMaster - Canada
 Ralph Stanley & The Clinch Mountain Boys - USA
 George Plimpton - USA
 Richard Thompson - UK
 Paul Brady - Ireland
 Penguin Café Orchestra - UK
 Courtney Pine - UK
 Beijing Acrobatic Circus - People's Republic of China
 World Champion Trinity Irish Dancers - USA
 Théâtre de l'Unité- France
 Robert Cray Band - USA
 Lavelle White - USA
 Iguanas - USA
 Kermit Ruffins - USA
 Ivan Neville - USA
 Terrance Simien - USA
 Buckwheat Zydeco - USA
 New Birth Brass Band - USA
 Gena Delafose - USA
 Eric Taylor - USA
 J.J. Grey & Mofro - USA
 Shake Russell - USA
 Shenzhen Acrobatic Circus - China
 Johnny Bush - USA
 Bettye LaVette - USA
 Harrison Kumi - Ghana
 Emeline Michel - Haiti
 The Wailers - Jamaica
 Emman Legrand - Congo
 Joaquin Diaz - Dominican Republic
 Lowrider Band - USA
 Rootz Underground - Jamaica
 Rachid Taha - Algeria
 Marcia Ball - USA
 CJ Chenier - USA
 Little Joe y la Familia - USA
 Marima Ponies - Japan
 Governor's Island Samba School - Brazil
 Zip Zap Circus - South Africa
 The Staple Singers - USA
 Blind Boys of Alabama - USA
 Nanci Griffith - USA
 Sweet Honey in the Rock - USA
 Paco de Lucía - Spain
 Milton Nascimento - Brazil
 Stomu Yamashta - Japan
 Café Tacuba - Mexico
 Los Lobos - USA
 Texas Tornados - USA
 Poncho Sanchez - USA
 Flaco Jiménez - USA
 Tito Puente - Puerto Rico
 Beau Jocque - USA
 Royal Thai Ballet - Thailand
 Dana Jackson - USA
 United We Funk Allstars - USA
 Beat the Donkey - Brazil
 Kem - USA
 Keith Frank - USA
 Neutral Sisters - Jamaica/USA
 Krosfyah - Barbados
 Lucky Dube - South Africa
 Ricardo Lemvo - Democratic Republic of Congo
 Bob Schneider - USA
 Kelly Willis - USA
 Los Lonely Boys - USA
 Buddy Guy - USA
 Emmylou Harris - USA
 Jesse Dayton - USA
 Reckless Kelly - USA
 Joss Stone - USA
 Cory Morrow - USA
 Shemekia Copeland - USA
 The Neville Brothers - USA
 Menwar - Mauritius
 The Garifuna Collective - Belize
 Habib Koite & Barmada - Mali
 Taj Mahal - USA
 Jimmy "T99" Nelson - USA 
 Samarabalouf - France
 Charlie Musselwhite - USA
 Beoga - Ireland
 The Wailing Souls - Jamaica
 Plena Libre - Puerto Rico
 Ohio Players - USA
 Ozomatli - Aztlan
 Mighty Diamonds - Jamaica
 Eddie Palmieri
 Taj Weekes & Adowa - St. Lucia
 Bassekou Kouyate & Ngoni Ba -Mali
 Lagbaja - Nigeria

References

External links

 ifest.org

Festivals in Houston
Rock festivals in the United States
Folk festivals in the United States
World music festivals